Ammanford Colliery Halt railway station, served the colliery near Ammanford, West Wales. Opened to serve the colliery, the station closed, leaving the current Ammanford station providing trains for the area.

History

Opened by the Great Western Railway, the halt stayed with that company during the Grouping of 1923. The station then passed on to the Western Region of British Railways on nationalisation in 1948.

The station was then closed by the British Transport Commission.

See also
Ammanford railway station

References

 
 
 Station on navigable O.S. map. Station east of town in Pontamman.

External links 

Disused railway stations in Carmarthenshire
Former Great Western Railway stations
Railway stations in Great Britain opened in 1905
Railway stations in Great Britain closed in 1958
1905 establishments in Wales
1958 disestablishments in Wales
Colliery halt